Estadio Guillermo Soto Rosa is a multi-use stadium in Mérida, Venezuela.  It is currently used mostly for football matches and was the home stadium of Estudiantes de Mérida Fútbol Club until Estadio Metropolitano de Mérida opened in 2005.  It currently hosts the home matches of the ULA football team.  The stadium holds 14,000 spectators.

References

Guillermo
Estudiantes de Mérida
Buildings and structures in Mérida (state)